Dongola is a city in Sudan.

Dongola may also refer to:

Places
Dongola, Illinois, a village in Union County
Dongola, Indiana, an unincorporated community in Gibson County
Dongola, Missouri, an unincorporated community in Bollinger County
Dongola, Ontario, an unincorporated community
Old Dongola, a deserted town in Sudan

Other
SS Dongola, a P&O liner launched in 1905 
Dongola (horse), a riding horse native to Africa
Dongola racing, a popular event in traditional local regattas
 A type of kidskin

See also